Adriano Louzada e Silva (born 16 February 1994), known simply as Adriano, is a Brazilian footballer who plays as a winger.

Career
Born in Anchieta, Espírito Santo, Adriano moved to Italy in 2008, aged 14, and joined Reggina Calcio's youth system. He made his professional debut on 26 May 2012, coming on as a second-half substitute in a 0–3 home loss to Vicenza Calcio.

References

External links

1994 births
Living people
Brazilian footballers
Brazil youth international footballers
Brazil under-20 international footballers
Association football midfielders
Serie B players
Reggina 1914 players
Brazilian expatriate footballers
Expatriate footballers in Italy
Brazilian expatriate sportspeople in Italy
Matera Calcio players
Modena F.C. players